Arthur David Hopkins (23 August 1902 – 1943) was a Welsh footballer who played as a full back for Rochdale.

References

Rochdale A.F.C. players
Ebbw Vale F.C. players
Footballers from Neath
Welsh footballers
Association football fullbacks
1902 births
1943 deaths